Dick Logan (born c. 1940) is a former American football coach.  He served as the head football coach at the University of San Diego from 1974 to 1975, compiling a record of 5–15.  Logan played college football at San Francisco State University, where he was a Far Western Conference center.  He was the head football coach at Santa Cruz High School in Santa Cruz, California from 1967 to 1969, before returning to his alma mater, San Francisco State, where he spent four seasons, from 1970 to 1973, as offensive coordinator.

Head coaching record

References

Year of birth missing (living people)
Living people
American football centers
San Diego Toreros football coaches
San Francisco State Gators football coaches
San Francisco State Gators football players
High school football coaches in California